Vladimir Alexandrovich Voevodsky (4 June 1966 – 30 September 2017) was a Russian-American mathematician. His work in developing a homotopy theory for algebraic varieties and formulating motivic cohomology led to the award of a Fields Medal in 2002. He is also known for the proof of the Milnor conjecture and motivic Bloch–Kato conjectures and for the univalent foundations of mathematics and homotopy type theory.

Early life and education 

Vladimir Voevodsky's father, Aleksander Voevodsky, was head of the Laboratory of High Energy Leptons in the Institute for Nuclear Research at the Russian Academy of Sciences. His mother Tatyana was a chemist. Voevodsky attended Moscow State University for a while, but was forced to leave without a diploma for refusing to attend classes and failing academically. He received his Ph.D. in mathematics from Harvard University in 1992 after being recommended without even applying, following several independent publications; he was advised there by David Kazhdan.

While he was a first year undergraduate, he was given a copy of Esquisse d'un Programme (submitted a few months earlier by Alexander Grothendieck to CNRS) by his advisor George Shabat. He learned the French language "with the sole purpose of being able to read this text" and started his research on some of the themes mentioned there.

Work 
Voevodsky's work was in the intersection of algebraic geometry with algebraic topology. Along with Fabien Morel, Voevodsky introduced a homotopy theory for schemes. He also formulated what is now believed to be the correct form of motivic cohomology, and used this new tool to prove Milnor's conjecture relating the Milnor K-theory of a field to its étale cohomology. For the above, he received the Fields Medal at the 24th International Congress of Mathematicians held in Beijing, China.

In 1998 he gave a plenary lecture (A1-Homotopy Theory) at the International Congress of Mathematicians in Berlin. He coauthored (with Andrei Suslin and Eric M. Friedlander) Cycles, Transfers and Motivic Homology Theories, which develops the theory of motivic cohomology in some detail.

From 2002, Voevodsky was a professor at the Institute for Advanced Study in Princeton, New Jersey.

In January 2009, at an anniversary conference in honor of  Alexander Grothendieck, held at the Institut des Hautes Études Scientifiques, Voevodsky announced a proof of the full Bloch–Kato conjectures.

In 2009, he constructed the univalent model of Martin-Löf type theory in simplicial sets. This led to important advances in type theory and in the development of new univalent foundations of mathematics that Voevodsky worked on in his final years. He worked on a Coq library UniMath using univalent ideas.

In April 2016, the University of Gothenburg awarded an honorary doctorate to Voevodsky.

Death and legacy 
Voevodsky died on 30 September 2017 at his home in Princeton, from an aneurysm. He is survived by daughters Diana Yasmine Voevodsky and Natalia Dalia Shalaby.

Selected works

Notes

References

Further reading
 More information about his work can be found on his website

External links

 Vladimir Voevodsky on GitHub Contains the slides of many of his recent lectures.
 По большому филдсовскому счету Интервью с Владимиром Воеводским и Лораном Лаффоргом
 Julie Rehmeyer, Vladimir Voevodsky, Revolutionary Mathematician, Dies at 51, New York Times, 6 October 2017
 
 

1966 births
2017 deaths
20th-century Russian mathematicians
21st-century Russian mathematicians
Fields Medalists
Algebraic geometers
Topologists
Harvard Graduate School of Arts and Sciences alumni
Institute for Advanced Study faculty
Soviet mathematicians
Sloan Research Fellows
Harvard Fellows
Russian expatriates in the United States
Scientists from Moscow